Single Homeless Project is a registered charity working to help single Londoners by preventing homelessness, providing support and accommodation, promoting wellbeing, enhancing opportunity and being a voice for change.

In 2020–2021, Single Homeless Project supported over 10,000 Londoners across all 32 boroughs, from supporting people in crisis to helping people take the final steps towards independence and employment.

For individuals who are homeless or at risk of becoming homeless, Single Homeless Project offers community-based programmes to help them retain their housing. People with a number of tenures, such as council, housing association, and private rental tenants, as well as those staying in bed & breakfasts and other temporary accommodation, are included.

Staff offer support with mental and physical health issues, debt, rent arrears, and domestic violence, as well as other crisis situations that may lead to homelessness.

History 
In 1975, Stuart Clark a homeless man and a founder member of Single Homeless Project persuaded a housing association in Pimlico to let him use a short-term property to house himself and five other homeless men, including Dennis Handfield, after whom a support hostel in Camden was later named.

The Pimlico property was the foundation for what became Single Homeless Project. Thanks to an Urban Aid grant, Single Homeless Project was able to establish itself in 1977, when it became a registered charity and Stuart became the first paid employee.

After the government announced the closure of large resettlement units and made funding available for smaller hostels and housing projects, Single Homeless Project led the way in an alternative approach to the homelessness crisis, which is based on small-scale converted residential properties with single rooms instead of dormitories. This reduced stigma, granting residents control over their own space and providing a sense of ‘home’. Instead of ‘self-improvement’, support focused on building people’s capacity to move on and live independently. 

While Single Homeless Project has changed a lot over the last five decades, the history and origins continue to pay integral in influencing the charity’s work in recent years.

Projects and programmes

Sport project 
The sport project has established in-house gyms at Single Homeless Project services, providing accessible aerobic and yoga sessions, bicycle maintenance and ride-out clubs, boxing, football, fishing, and table tennis sessions, all while debunking the myth that people experiencing homelessness aren't interested in or capable of participating in sports. The National Lottery Sport England, London Housing Foundation, and KKR have provided significant funding, support, and ongoing collaboration for the project.

Fulfilling Lives Islington and Camden (FLIC) 
Fulfilling Lives in Islington & Camden is an eight-year Lottery funded learning programme established in May 2014 and closing in May 2022. It is designed to support people experiencing multiple disadvantages and affect system change to improve the experience and outcomes for people accessing services.

Overall, the programme has proved a great success, and has achieved high level of sustained engagement with people often deemed ‘hard to engage’.

Peer Mentor Programme 
Single Homeless Project's Peer Mentoring Programme aims to model visible recovery, with Peers Mentors – individuals who have lived experience of homelessness – supporting and empowering others to take control of their recovery.

Peer mentors use their experiences to support others through a similar journey of recovery, whether it is homelessness, substance use and recovery and/or mental health issues.

Project Kali 
In 2020, Project Kali, a female-focused service for women experiencing homelessness and a history of offending was established to support women with complex needs leaving prison.

The project has seen outstanding results, with 93% of women supported through the service offending less and over half stopping completely; and in 2021, the project was awarded 'Homelessness Project of the Year' in the UK Housing Awards.

Opportunities Programme 
The Opportunities programme provides collaborative and creative ways for people experiencing homelessness to take an active part, to learn, share and grow. The positive life experiences gained, and healthy relationships developed, provide a renewed sense of hope, confidence and possibility. These often serve as a turning point for people in their recovery.

See also 
 Homeless charities in the United Kingdom
 Homelessness in the United Kingdom

References

External links
SHP web site

Homelessness charities in the United Kingdom
Organizations established in 1977
Charities based in London
1977 establishments in England